A&E Records is a United Kingdom-based record label imprint, owned by Warner Music Group (WMG). It operates under the WEA International group of labels at WMG.

A&E Records was formalised in May 2003, when the NewsCorp Music Group of independent record labels (comprising Mushroom Records UK, Infectious Records, Ultimate Dilemma, Perfecto and 48K) were absorbed into WMG's East West after 20 months of negotiations, with all of its roster transferring over. In November 2004, A&E Records was realigned, and transferred across the company to within the Warner Bros label.

History

A&E Records was formalised on 19 May 2003, with all of Mushroom Records UK and Infectious' artist roster transferring over to the East West imprint, including its new signings The Darkness, Funeral for a Friend and Freeform Five, while Korda Marshall took up the position of managing director with the label. WMG completed its acquisition of Mushroom Records for around $15m (£9.2m) and East West absorbed the functions of Mushroom, which was closed the week prior. East West immediately re-issued its new artists back catalogue albums through A&E Records and Warner Strategic Marketing distribution.

The following year, from 25 June 2004, East West was subject to the rebranding as one of WMG's two frontline UK labels, changing to Atlantic Records (the other label WEA London becoming Warner Bros). On 14 November of that year, Marshall became managing director of Warner Bros. A&E Records was realigned, and transferred across the company to Warner Bros. The Infectious brand name and logo also transferred from Atlantic, along with Ash, Garbage and Muse.

A&E Records has continued to release records by Garbage (until 2007) and Timo Maas and to release Muse records through sub-label Helium 3. The role of Infectious within Warner Bros has been decreased and not including Ash releases, is being used for launching newly signed acts such as The Subways and Larrikin Love. Former parent Festival Mushroom Records was acquired by WMG on 21 October 2005 and its labels and artists absorbed into Warner Music Australia, however none of those artists have been transferred to A&E Records.

A&E Records discography

Albums

Mushroom Records UK

Mushroom Records UK was set up in London in 1993 by Gary Ashley, as an offshoot of the Australian independent label Mushroom Records, which had been formed in 1972 by Michael Gudinski and Ray Evans in Melbourne. Mushroom Records UK was intended mainly to serve the UK with Australian musical imports. Marshall had previously been RCA's head of A&R, and had left the company to establish his own Infectious Records which he aligned under Mushroom Records UK.

The label's first worldwide signing was US rock group Garbage, who became the flagship for the label, achieving multi-million sales with their first album release. Concerned that they were only known in the United Kingdom for the Neighbours theme (composed by Mushroom Music Publishing), to move away from the association, Mushroom founded the Discordant label for the sole purpose of launching Garbage. Although following their debut single, Garbage were reconciled with the main label, a few Australian acts such as Garageland and Deadstar were licensed to Discordant.

Mushroom had early success with Australian singer Peter Andre, while retaining a diverse roster signing UK acts such as The Wildhearts, and importing Australian acts such as Deni Hines, Christian Fry, Ween, Antenna, Sister2Sister, VAST and Yothu Yindi. Several acts were signed to Infectious Records, including Ash, Symposium, My Vitriol, Cable, Seafood, Elevator Suite and Pop Will Eat Itself, while Mushroom licensed local signing Muse from Taste Media. Sub labels Perfecto had successes with Paul Oakenfold and offshoot label 48K artist Timo Maas; sister label Ultimate Dilemma also had Zero 7, Magnet and Roots Manuva on its books. In 1999, Mushroom Records UK was one of only two labels who wanted to sign singer Kylie Minogue (ultimately she chose to sign to Parlophone).

With these acts charting highly brought Mushroom to the front stage of music in the UK, with an initial £5,000 turnover increasing to £23m over its 10 years, however Marshall began to extricate Mushroom UK from the Mushroom family during 2001, after the parent company had been sold in 1999 to Rupert Murdoch's Newscorp, and merged with his Festival Records to form Festival Mushroom Records. Mushroom Records UK was slowly wound down as negotiations crystallised; its last release was the Garbage single "Shut Your Mouth" in September 2002.

Mushroom Records UK discography

Albums

References

External links 
 WMG.com – Warner Music Group official site

Record labels established in 2003
British record labels
Warner Music labels
IFPI members